Chris Humphreys is a Canadian actor, playwright and novelist. Born in Toronto, Ontario. His father, Peter Humphreys, was an actor, writer and Battle of Britain] fighter pilot. His mother, Ingegerd Holter, was a spy in the Norwegian resistance. Chris is also the grandson of actor Cecil Humphreys. He was raised in Los Angeles, California until the age of seven and then grew up in the United Kingdom. For screen acting he is best known for roles in: The Bill where he played PC Richard Turnham from 1989 to 1990, as Caleb Wilson the gladiator in AD Anno Domini  and leading roles in: Zorro, Coronation Street, Hawkeye, Highlander: The Series, Goodnight Sweetheart, Wycliffe, Silent Witness, Scandal, The Core, The Adventures of Shirley Holmes.

Leading stage roles have included Lord Mountbatten in the West End musical Always. Hamlet in Hamlet, Oberon in A Midsummer Nights Dream and Jack Absolute in The Rivals. (The main character for his Jack Absolute series of novels is based on the 1775 stage play The Rivals by Richard Brinsley Sheridan.) Recent roles include: Halvard Solness in Ibsen's The Master Builder;  Tom in David Hare's Skylight ; Krapp in Samuel Beckett's Krapp's Last Tape

As C.C. Humphreys he has written 12 novels of historical fiction including the award-winning Plague as well as the International bestseller Vlad The Last Confession. He is translated in several languages.

He writes fantasy novels as Chris Humphreys including Smokin’ That Gas published by Gollancz, first book in the Immortals Blood series and the forthcoming The Hunt of the Unicorn  first book in the Tapestry Trilogy.

His plays have been produced in the UK and Canada, including Shakespeare’s Rebel, at Vancouver's Bard on the Beach festival in 2015

Chris lives on Salt Spring Island, British Columbia, Canada.

The Bill
Humphreys has recorded Audio Commentaries for several of his The Bill episodes, including "Traffic" (alongside writer Christopher Russell and co-star Andrew Mackintosh) and "Citadel" (alongside writer J.C. Wilsher). Humphreys was also reunited with eight of his Sun Hill co-stars for a three-part Zoom reunion for The Bill Podcast Patreon Channel.

Bibliography
Jack Absolute series
Jack Absolute. Orion Books, 2003.
The Blooding of Jack Absolute. Orion Books, 2006.
Absolute Honour. Orion Books, 2006.

The French Executioner series
The French Executioner. Orion Books, 2002.
Blood Ties. Orion Books, 2003.

The Runestone Saga
The Fetch. Random House Children's Books, 2006.
Vendetta. Random House Children's Books, 2007.
Possession. Random House Children's Books, 2008.

Other novels
Vlad: The Last Confession. Orion Books, 2009. 
A Place Called Armageddon. Orion Books, 2011  (about the Fall of Constantinople)
The Hunt of the Unicorn. Knopf Books for Young Readers, 2011. 
Shakespeare's Rebel. Orion Books, 2014
Plague: Century/Doubleday/Two Hats 2014
Fire: Century/Doubleday/Two Hats 2016
Chasing the Wind: Doubleday/Two Hats 2018

Short Stories
'Where the Angels Wait'. Pulp Literature, Issue 1, 2014.
'The Ankle Bracelet'. Pulp Literature, Issue 14, 2017.

References

External links

Official Author Site
Personal Blog
The Bill Podcast Interview

Year of birth missing (living people)
21st-century British novelists
British historical novelists
British male television actors
Living people
British dramatists and playwrights
British male novelists
British male dramatists and playwrights
Writers from Toronto
21st-century British male writers